Eagle Island is one of the Apostle Islands, in Lake Superior, in northern Wisconsin, and is part of the Apostle Islands National Lakeshore. The National Park Service does not allow entry onto the island in order not to disturb the birds that nest there. Eagle Island is the second-smallest and westernmost island in the Apostle islands.

Notes

Apostle Islands
Landforms of Bayfield County, Wisconsin
Protected areas of Bayfield County, Wisconsin
Uninhabited islands of Wisconsin